University Medical Center  in Lubbock, Texas is a public, non-profit 500-bed hospital.

UMC is the primary hospital of UMC Health System and as a public hospital for the citizens of Lubbock County is owned by the taxpayers. UMC is also the primary teaching hospital for the Texas Tech University Health Sciences Center (TTUHSC), is home to the only Level 1 Trauma Center and Pediatric Level 2 Trauma Center in the region, and has been the only Burn Center in the region for over 30 years.

UMC Health System also encompasses the UMC Children's Hospital which has been a part of the Children's Miracle Network for over 35 years. UMC Children’s Hospital includes a pediatric intensive care unit, a neonatal intensive care unit and, as of 2021, has opened UMC Children’s Emergency Center.

Lubbock's 9-1-1 Emergency Medical Service is provided through UMC, serving over 300,000 people (city and county) with Medical Intensive Care Unit (paramedic-staffed) ambulances. UMC EMS responds to over 31,000 9-1-1 calls per year through a priority dispatch system and provides over 27,000 transports.

At UMC, Service is our Passion…that is the name of our internal culture of patient centeredness and employee wellbeing. Whether you are managing a chronic condition, dealing with an unexpected illness, or simply working to stay healthy throughout your life, our focus is on providing a wide range of clinical expertise along with an exceptional healthcare experience because Our Passion is You. 

During the last 40+ years UMC has become the health system patients trust and a great investment for Lubbock County taxpayers. Together with UMC Physicians, UMC has seen an increase in educational support of TTUHSC, market share, demand for service, scope of care and growth in reputation. Even during difficult economic times, as well as a pandemic, sound financial planning and partnership with TTUHSC has allowed the system to thrive. 

UMC's team has over 4,700 employees who serve an organization that has been recognized as “One of the Best Companies to Work for in Texas®.”

Economic Impact 

 Employs more than 4,700 employees 
 Distributes more than $280 million in payroll 
 Maintains an operating budget of $680 million 
 UMC’s stewardship to Lubbock County yields a nearly 4 to 1 ratio of unfunded care to tax receipts. UMC’s tax burden as a percent of operating budget is the lowest in the state among major hospital districts at 3.4% (average is 24.6%).   
 Trains more than 400 physicians and nurses each year as the academic teaching hospital for TTUHSC

Partners in Care 
UMC is proud to partner with two outstanding health care organizations: UMC Physicians and the Texas Tech University Health Sciences Center. This partnership provides the West Texas and Eastern New Mexico regions with the best in care—from hometown clinics to intensive care units.

UMC Physicians 
UMC Physicians (UMCP) provides outstanding family-centered, urgent, and occupational care across the South Plains. More than 400,000 visits to a UMCP clinic take place annually in facilities from Wolfforth to Post, including urgent care clinics.

Texas Tech University Health Sciences Center 
UMC is the primary teaching hospital for the Texas Tech University Health Sciences Center. UMC has helped TTUHSC train over 10,000 healthcare professionals and counting. Texas Tech Physicians are leaders in patient care, education, and research. Texas Tech Physicians providers, residents, and students help UMC form a leading medical team that only a teaching hospital can provide.

External links 
 Awards and Recognition  
 Leadership
 Clinics

References

Teaching hospitals in Texas
Hospitals in Lubbock, Texas